The Instrumentalist is an American monthly magazine for music educators — focusing on scholastic band and orchestra — and performing artists and composers.  Founded by Traugott Rohner (1906–1991), its first publication was dated September/October 1946.  Its original address was in Glen Ellyn, Illinois.  The current holding company, The Instrumentalist Publishing Co., is an Illinois corporation, based in Northbrook, Illinois, and headed by James (Jim) Traugott Rohner (born 1940), President, and his two children, Ann Rohner Callis and James Matthew Rohner.  The three are Publisher, Associate Publisher, and Editor, respectively.

Former frequency 
 1946: September/October to 1950: May/June  — Bimonthly (published during the school year)
 1950: September         to 1953: May/June  — 6 per year
 1953: September         to 1955: May       — 9 per year
 1955: September         to 1957: June 1957 — 10 per year
 1957: August            to 1959: November  — 11 per year

Sponsor of awards 
  John Philip Sousa Musical Talent Award, an annual award presented by The Instrumentalist for leadership, co-operation, and musical talent

References

External links 
 Official website
 

Bimonthly magazines published in the United States
Music magazines published in the United States
Classical music magazines
Education magazines
Magazines established in 1946
Magazines published in Illinois
1946 establishments in Illinois
Nine times annually magazines
Ten times annually magazines